In mathematics and theoretical physics, resummation is a procedure to obtain a finite result from a divergent sum (series) of functions. Resummation involves a definition of another (convergent) function in which the individual terms defining the original function are re-scaled, and an integral transformation of this new function to obtain the original function. Borel resummation is probably the most well-known example.
The simplest method is an extension of a variational approach to higher order based on a paper by R.P. Feynman and H. Kleinert.
In quantum mechanics it was extended to any order here, and in quantum field theory here.
See also Chapters 16–20 in the textbook cited below.

See also 

 Perturbation theory
 Perturbation theory (quantum mechanics)

References

Books 
 Hagen Kleinert, Critical Properties of φ4-Theories, World Scientific (Singapore, 2001);  Paperback  (also available online) (together with V. Schulte-Frohlinde).

Quantum field theory
Summability methods